Rhode Island used at-large districts, but elected the candidates on separate tickets instead of using a general ticket.

See also 
 United States House of Representatives elections, 1798 and 1799
 List of United States representatives from Rhode Island

1798
Rhode Island
United States House of Representatives